Nan is one of Thailand's seventy-six provinces (changwat) lies in upper northern Thailand.  Neighboring provinces are (from south clockwise): Uttaradit, Phrae, and Phayao. To the north and east it borders Sainyabuli of Laos.

Geography
The province is in the remote Nan River valley, surrounded by forested mountains, the Phlueng Range in the western part and the Luang Prabang Range in the east. The highest mountain is the 2,079 meter high Phu Khe in Bo Kluea District, northeast of the city of Nan towards the border with Laos.

National parks
There are seven national parks, along with three other national parks, make up region 13 (Phrae) of Thailand's protected areas.
 Doi Phu Kha National Parks, 
 Si Nan National Park, 
 Mae Charim  National Park, 
 Nanthaburi National Park, 
 Khun Sathan National Park, 
 Tham Sakoen National Park, 
 Khun Nan National Park,

Climate
Nan province has a tropical savanna climate (Köppen climate classification Aw). Winters are quite dry and very warm. The monsoon season runs from late April through October, with heavy rain and somewhat cooler temperatures during the day, although nights remain warm.

History

For centuries Nan was an independent kingdom but, due to its remoteness, had few connections to the other kingdoms. The first kingdom around the city Mueang Pua (also known as Varanagara) was created in the late-13th century. Its rulers, the Phukha dynasty, were related to the founders of Vientiane, however it became associated with the Sukhothai Kingdom as it was easier to reach from the south than from the east or west. In the 14th century the capital was moved to its present location at Nan.

In the 15th century, when Sukhothai declined in power, it became vassal of the kingdom of Lannathai. In 1443 King Kaen Thao of Nan plotted to capture neighboring Phayao by asking King Tilokaraj to help him fight against Vietnamese troops attacking Nan, even though there was no such threat. Kaen Thao killed the king of Phayao, however the troops of Tilokaraj then attacked Nan itself, and captured it in 1449.

Between 1560-1785, Nan was colonized by Burma many times. Nan was also the abandoned city without people twice: first from 1704-1706, and later in 1778–1801.

When Lannathai was under Burmese rule, Nan tried to liberate itself many times without success, which finally led to Burmese rule of Nan in 1714. In 1788 the Burmese rulers were finally driven out. Nan had to then accept new rulers from Siam. In 1893 after the Paknam crisis Siam had to give a big part of eastern Nan to French Indochina. In 1899 mueang Nan became part of the circle (Monthon) Tawan Tok Chiang Nuea (northwestern circle). In 1916 the northwestern circle was split and Nan was assigned to the circle Maharat. When the circles were abolished in 1932, the provinces including Nan became top-level subdivisions of Siam.

Before the early-1980s, bandits as well as People's Liberation Army of Thailand (PLAT) guerrillas were a big problem in the province, usually destroying highway construction overnight. With the help of the army and the more stable political system the province improved significantly, but is still a very rural and remote area.

Economy
Agriculture is the province's main industry, but tourism in 2016 contributed an estimated 30% to the provincial GDP. The number of hotel rooms in Nan has doubled to 4,000 in 2016. The Tourism Department says arrivals to Nan rose by 19% to 1.76 million in 2015, of which Thais numbered 1.44 million. Tourism revenue rose by 14% to 4.43 billion baht. The Tourism Authority of Thailand (TAT) expects tourist arrivals to Nan will rise by 10% to 1.94 million in 2016 as tourism revenue grows by 10% to 4.88 billion baht.  "We want only quality tourists, not a big volume", said a spokesman. In 2018 some 939,240 tourists visited Nan, up 4.4% year-on-year, contributing 2.6 billion baht in tourism income, a gain of 8.3%. Most visitors—97%—are Thais, of whom 62% were repeat visitors. Just 3% were foreign tourists from the US, France, China, Japan, and Laos. In the first eight months of 2019 Nan welcomed 643,129 tourists, up 0.2% year-on-year, generating 1.94 billion baht in income, up 2.1%. 
According to the Bangkok Post, the top two attractions in Nan province are Doi Samer Dao and Wat Phumin, a temple with many "local art masterpieces".

Environmental issues
Nan and government forestry officials are concerned about deforestation after hill tribes turned 1.5 million rai of forest land into cornfields. Nan Governor, Mr Suwat, says officials have attempted to persuade hill tribes to grow perennial plants such as cashew nuts and bamboo in the forest legally. "It's impossible to solve the deforestation problem without involving the hill tribes," he says. "We must give them a solution to live in the forest and protect nature at the same time."

Symbols

The provincial seal shows a Usuparatch bull carrying the stupa of Phrathat Chae Haeng. The buffalo dates back to a legend that the rulers of Nan and Phrae were brothers, and met at a mountain to decide about the boundary between their lands. The ruler of Nan went there on a buffalo, while the ruler of Phrae went there on a horse.

The provincial tree and provincial flower is the Orchid Tree (Bauhinia variegata).

Demographics
Hill tribes constitute 10.5 percent of the population. Inhabitants known as the T'in or Mal people speak a Northern Mon-Khmer or Khmuic language, T'in, an unknown language when Gérard Diffloth's classifications were widely cited in a 1974 Encyclopædia Britannica article.

Administrative divisions

Provincial government
The province is divided into 15 districts
(amphoe). These are further divided into 99 subdistricts (tambons) and 848 villages (mubans).

Local government
As of 26 November 2019 there are: one Nan Provincial Administration Organisation and 19 municipal (thesaban) areas in the province. Nan has town (thesaban mueang) status. Further 18 subdistrict municipalities (thesaban tambon). The non-municipal areas are administered by 80 Subdistrict Administrative Organisations – SAO (ongkan borihan suan tambon).

Human achievement index 2017

Since 2003, United Nations Development Programme (UNDP) in Thailand has tracked progress on human development at sub-national level using the Human achievement index (HAI), a composite index covering all the eight key areas of human development. National Economic and Social Development Board (NESDB) has taken over this task since 2017.

Gallery

See also
 Nan Nakhon Airport.

References

Further reading
Filbeck, D. (1978). T'in: a historical study. Pacific linguistics, no. 49. Canberra: Dept. of Linguistics, Research School of Pacific Studies, Australian National University. 
 Goodden, Christian. Hinterlands: Sixteen New Do-It-Yourself Jungle Treks in Thailand's Nan & Mae Hong Son Provinces. Halesworth, England: Jungle Books, 2001. 
 Scholten, J. J., and Wichai Boonyawat. Detailed Reconnaissance Soil Survey of Nan Province. Kingdom of Thailand, Soil Survey Division, 1972.

External links

Tourist Authority of Thailand (TAT): Nan
Golden Jubilee Network province guide 
Nan provincial map, coat of arms and postal stamp 

 
Provinces of Thailand